David Kent Robinson (born 1954) is an American professor of European history, emeritus, and the past department chair at Truman State University. He is the past president of the Missouri Conference of American Association of University Professors.

Early life

Robinson was born in 1954 on a farm in southern Indiana. After completing his schooling, he attended Harvard College intending to complete a degree in chemistry. Instead his interests turned towards history of general science.

Education and career

Robinson received his A.B., magna cum laude, in History and Science from Harvard College in 1976. He then went on to receive his M.A. in History from the University of California, Berkeley in 1980. Robinson received his Ph.D. in History from the University of California, Berkeley in 1987, with a dissertation entitled "Wilhelm Wundt and the Establishment of Experimental Psychology". He teaches a wide range of courses at Truman State University, including: World Civilizations I and II, Introduction to History and Historiography, Topics: European Social History Since 1700, Topics: Darwinism (in Europe and America), Modern Germany, and Modern European Diplomatic History.

Books and articles
Robinson has published numerous academic and scholarly works.

Those published works include:
After the Fulbright: Continuing Work in Ukraine Fulbright-Ukraine
 Rieber, R. W., & Robinson, D. K. (Eds.). (2013). The essential Vygotsky. Springer Science & Business Media.

Notes

References
 

1954 births
Living people
Truman State University faculty
Historians of Europe
Harvard University alumni
University of California, Berkeley alumni